Rowe Hessler (born on February 27, 1991, on Long Island, New York) is a two-time former speedcubing U.S. Champion and runner-up World Champion as of 2011. He held the North American record for the average of 5 Rubik's Cube solves almost continuously from 2009 to 2014, during which time the record dropped from 11.11 seconds to 8.27 seconds. As of December 2022, his average of 7.63 seconds ranks him 325th in the world. Hessler is also known for his expertise in the 2x2x2 event, having set the former world record in 2009 with an average time of 2.45 seconds. In October 2009, he attended the World Championships in Germany and was crowned World Champion in the 2x2x2 event.

World records

North American records

References

1991 births
Living people
American speedcubers
People from Long Island